The third edition of Liège–Bastogne–Liège for Women, a road cycling one-day race in Belgium, was held on 28 April 2019. It was the ninth event of the 2019 UCI Women's World Tour. The race started in Bastogne and finished in Liège, including five categorised climbs, covering a total distance of 138.5 km. It was won by Annemiek van Vleuten.

Route 
The route is changed from previous editions with the finish now in Liège, rather than Ans. At 138.5 km, the race is approximately half the distance of the men's event. It starts in Bastogne, from where it heads north to finish in Liège on the same location as the men's race. The route features five categorised climbs: the Côte de Wanne, Côte de Brume, Côte de la Vecquée, Côte de La Redoute, and Côte de la Roche aux faucons.

Teams
Twenty four teams, each with a maximum of six riders, started the race:

Result

UCI World Tour

References

2019 UCI Women's World Tour
2019 in Belgian sport
2019
April 2019 sports events in Belgium